Future of the Left are a Welsh alternative rock band based in Cardiff. The group consists of former Mclusky members Andrew Falkous (vocals, guitar) and Jack Egglestone (drums) and former Million Dead bassist Julia Ruzicka.

History

Beginnings
Future of the Left formed in mid-2005 after the bands Mclusky and Jarcrew both split up within two months of each other at the beginning of the year.  The new group was formed by singer/guitarist Andy "Falco" Falkous and drummer Jack Egglestone, both previously of Mclusky, alongside singer/bassist Kelson Mathias and bassist Hywel Evans, both formerly of Jarcrew. Evans quickly moved on to start a math rock band, Truckers of Husk.

First performances
Future of the Left's first performances were secret gigs using aliases such as "Guerilla Press" and "Dead Redneck" to avoid the concert being attended by large numbers of expectant Mclusky and Jarcrew fans.  Their very first show was at Clwb Ifor Bach, Cardiff on 2 July 2006, under the alias "the Mooks of Passim".  The first official headline show (and the first show the band played under the name Future of the Left) was played in Camden Barfly to a capacity crowd on 1 September 2006.

In late 2006 the trio were signed to Too Pure, who had also signed Mclusky, and when Too Pure disbanded the band transferred to 4AD.

Singles
The band released their debut single, the double A-side "Fingers Become Thumbs"/"The Lord Hates A Coward" (along with B-side "The Fibre Provider") on 7-inch vinyl on 29 January 2007 in extremely limited quantities. A Too Pure newsletter sent out in March announced that the Future of the Left live set-closer "adeadenemyalwayssmellsgood..." would feature on a split single alongside Fierce Panda Records' Winnebago Deal on 10 May. However, Falco stated that it would only happen "over [his] dead body". The song was released as a 7-inch single on 4 June 2007, however it was not split with anyone; the B-side was a BBC Radio Wales session track entitled "March Of The Coupon Saints". On 10 September, the band released "Small Bones Small Bodies" as a single on 7" vinyl (with "The Big Wide O" and "I Need To Know How To Kill A Cat" as B-sides).

Debut album
Their debut album, Curses, was released on 24 September 2007 in the UK and 1 October in Japan. A surprise to some fans of Jarcrew and Mclusky was the band's occasional move towards songs with a synthesizer (a Roland Juno-60) in favour of Falco's guitar.  On the whole, fans and critics responded to the change positively.

Travels With Myself and Another
Falkous revealed in an early 2008 online blog entry that work had commenced on the second album - new material began to creep into the band's live performances, including a number of songs that feature distinctively more ambitious use of Falkous' synthesizer. The band drew the attention of NME and was invited to perform on the NME Awards tour, supporting Les Savy Fav at London Astoria.

On 8 April 2008, their fourth single "Manchasm" was released (with album track "Suddenly It's A Folk Song" and new recording "Sum Of All Parts" as B-sides), receiving a single of the week recommendation from the NME. The band toured extensively during 2008, with sets occasionally including covers of Mclusky tracks. They appeared at the Reading and Leeds Festivals on the NME/BBC Radio 1 stage on Friday 22nd and Saturday 23 August. The band then toured in the United States with Against Me! and Ted Leo and the Pharmacists till the end of October 2008.

On 21 November 2008, Future Of The Left cancelled the remainder of their tour of the UK, China and Australia to concentrate on recording the new album. In a statement the band said, 
We have been unable to write the second record and we are increasingly aware of the need to do so. We want to get it out before summer so we can spend next year playing it to people. It is against everything the band stands for to pull shows, or anything that we have already committed to doing, and we apologise to everyone who had bought a ticket or was going to come along. We will be back as soon as we can next year and we promise to make it worth the wait.

They released their second album Travels with Myself and Another on 22 June 2009. However, the album was leaked a month before onto the internet, singer Falkous mentioned his anger at this in a series of blogs. Regardless, the album received critical acclaim from reviewers, gaining 9/10 from Drowned in Sound and 8/10 from Pitchfork Media.

Personnel changes
On 7 May 2010, Kelson Mathias announced his departure from the band via a blog on the band's MySpace profile.

On the same day, in a separate blog, Andy Falkous announced that Steven Hodson (the bass player of Oceansize and Kong) would be filling in on bass for their upcoming shows, and also that the band had a "soon-to-revealed fourth member, whose main role(s) in the band are to play guitar and act like a fucking maniac".
The band played summer dates around the UK and were also working on new material for a third album, playing a few new tracks at these dates.

Julia Ruzicka, ex-member and co-founder of Million Dead, made her live debut with the band on 17 September and confirmation of her permanent role was made via the band's Myspace blog on 21 October.

On 6 November 2010 Falco announced, via the band's Twitter feed, that they were in the studio recording new songs. In January 2011 in an interview with Undercover.fm he announced that the new album would be released in September.

The Plot Against Common Sense

In November 2011, the band released the six track EP Polymers Are Forever. Falco also announced via the band's blog that the new album had been completed, was entitled The Plot Against Common Sense and comprised fifteen tracks.

The album was released on 11 June 2012, preceded by single "Sheena is a T-Shirt Salesman" on 12 March. Videos were also released for the tracks "I Am The Least Of Your Problems" and "Failed Olympic Bid". The band released an EP of demos from the album sessions entitled Man vs. Melody in November 2012.

How To Stop Your Brain in an Accident

In May 2013 it was announced that Future of the Left would crowdfund their next album through the website Pledge. The funding goal for the album was reached in just five hours.

The band rewarded pledgers with a four track EP entitled Love Songs For Our Husbands released on 1 July, through their own new label, Prescriptions Music. The full-length new album entitled How to Stop Your Brain in an Accident was released for streaming on 21 October and was released in physical format on 28 October.  In addition, a sessions EP for the album was also announced, entitled Human Death.

The Peace and Truce of Future of the Left

In December 2015 Future of the Left announced they would once again crowdfund for their fifth studio album entitled The Peace and Truce of Future of the Left. The funding goal was reached within three hours.

Set for a release date of 25 March 2016 the band announced they would again record another sessions EP in addition to the new album and pledgers could also buy a special Fuzz Pedal specially created for the band. The album was released on 8 April 2016.

Guitar player/vocalist Jimmy Watkins was absent from the recording of the album and is no longer a member of Future of the Left.

As for the title, on an appearance on Conan Neutron's Protonic Reversal Falco elaborated 21 September 2016:
The Peace and Truce of God, pre-chivalry was a code for knights that weren't exactly the genuine paladins that history would paint them to be, but thugs with armor riding around the countryside taking what they wanted in every kind of sense. So the Peace and Truce of God was an attempt to give some kind of code and set of rules to those people. There's no obvious parallel with the band, but just generally speaking it had been a rough couple of years, and it had the feeling of being after a battle.

Not quite dramatic, you often don't realize something is difficult and that is taking something out of you until after it's finished. There's a certain assessment you make that it ends up being a bit more depressing than you originally thought.

It's just words, It was just right. i'll say something to Julia and Jack and they'll say yeah, that's right. 'That's the title then. That was a clause, it made sense, there was a noun.'

Members

Current
Andy "Falco" Falkous – vocals, guitar, keyboards, bass (2005–present)
Jack Egglestone – drums (2005–present)
Julia Ruzicka – bass, vocals, keyboards (2010–present)

Former
Kelson Mathias – bass, vocals, keyboards, guitar (2005–2010)
Hywel Evans – guitar (2005)
Jimmy Watkins – guitar, vocals (2010–2015)

Touring musicians
Steven Hodson – bass, vocals, keyboards (2010)
Ian Catskilkin – guitar, vocals (2014, 2016)
Damien 'Big Red' Sayell – Bass, vocals (2018-)

Discography

Studio albums
 Curses (24 September 2007)
 Travels with Myself and Another (22 June 2009)
 The Plot Against Common Sense (11 June 2012)
 How to Stop Your Brain in an Accident (28 October 2013)
 The Peace & Truce of Future of the Left (8 April 2016) (UK no. 99)

EPs
 Polymers Are Forever (14 November 2011)
 At Magnetic West (21 April 2012)
 Man vs. Melody (November 2012)
 Love Songs for Our Husbands (July 2013)
 Human Death (2013)
 To Failed States and Forest Clearings (2016)

Live albums
 Last Night I Saved Her from Vampires (2009)
 Live at the Garage (2017)

Singles
 "Fingers Become Thumbs"/"The Lord Hates a Coward" (29 January 2007)
 "adeadenemyalwayssmellsgood" (4 June 2007)
 "Small Bones Small Bodies" (10 September 2007) No. 25 UK Indie
 "Manchasm" (8 April 2008)
 "The Hope That House Built" (16 March 2009)
 "Stand by Your Manatee"/"Preoccupation Therapy"
 "Sheena Is a T-Shirt Salesman" (12 March 2012)
 "The Limits of Battleships" (9 February 2016)

Music videos
 "adeadenemyalwayssmellsgood" (2007)
 "Manchasm" (2008)
 "The Hope That House Built" (2009)
 "Arming Eritrea" (2009)
 "Failed Olympic Bid" (2012)
 "Sheena Is a T-Shirt Salesman" (2012)
 "I Am the Least of Your Problems" (2012)
 "Things to Say to Friendly Policemen" (2013)
 "French Lessons" (2014)

Compilation appearances
 "Small Bones Small Bodies" on 2000 Trees – Cider Smiles Vol.1, Hide and Seek Records, June 2008

References

External links

 
 Official Blog
 Future of the Left biography from BBC Wales

Welsh alternative rock groups
British musical trios
4AD artists
Musical groups from Cardiff
British post-hardcore musical groups
Underground punk scene in the United Kingdom